Max Bog is a 10.6 hectare biological Site of Special Scientific Interest in North Somerset, notified in 1988.

The site is owned by North Somerset Council and managed by the Avon Wildlife Trust for the range of wetland plants that it supports.  There is no access without a permit.

Ecology

Marsh Helleborine occurs here and nowhere else in Avon. Lesser Butterfly-orchid and Fragrant Orchid also occur here, and at only one other Avon site each. It is also home to Yellow Rattle, Meadow Sweet and Meadow Thistle. The reserve is also important for its invertebrate interest and is home to many species of moth, grasshopper and dragonfly.

Narrow-leaved Marsh-orchid is found in adjacent fields.

Dactylorhiza orchids are well represented, including the hybrids D. × grandis and D. × hallii.

See also
Yanal Bog, a similar SSSI to the northeast of Max Bog

References

External links
English Nature (SSSI information)

Bogs of England
Sites of Special Scientific Interest in North Somerset
Sites of Special Scientific Interest notified in 1988